The Children of Gibeon is a 1920 British silent drama film based on a novel by Sir Walter Besant, directed by Sidney Morgan and starring Joan Morgan, Langhorn Burton and Eileen Magrath. An aristocrat adopts a criminal's daughter and brings her up with her own daughter. She never reveals to them which way round they were.

Cast
 Joan Morgan as Violet  
 Langhorn Burton as Clive  
 Eileen Magrath as Valentine  
 Sydney Fairbrother as Mrs. Gibeon  
 Alice De Winton as Lady Eldridge  
 Arthur Lennard as Mr. Gibeon  
 Charles Cullum as Jack Conyers 
 Barbara McFarlane as Violet

References

Bibliography
 Low, Rachael. The History of the British Film 1918-1929. George Allen & Unwin, 1971.

External links
 

1920 films
British drama films
British silent feature films
Films directed by Sidney Morgan
1920 drama films
Films set in England
Films based on British novels
British black-and-white films
1920s English-language films
1920s British films
Silent drama films